Joan Maude (16 January 1908 – 28 September 1998) was an English actress, active from the 1920s to the 1950s. She is probably best known for playing the Chief Recorder in the 1946 Powell and Pressburger film A Matter of Life and Death.

The daughter of actors Charles Maude and Nancy Price, Maude's great grandmother on her father's side was the singer Jenny Lind, known as the "Swedish Nightingale". Maude was a cousin of the actor-manager Cyril Maude.

Maude married firstly Scottish Rugby International player and journalist Frank Waters (1909-1954), with whom she had a daughter. In 1956 she married Oliver Woods (1911-1972). She was the writer, producer, and production designer of the short film All Hallowe'en (1952).

Her mother, an author as well as an actress, published a book Behind the night-light: the by-world of a child of three in 1912 recording 'faithfully' the beasts and animals Joan imagined as a 3 year old.

Filmography

This Freedom (1923) - Hilda
Next Gentleman Please (1927) - Fortune-teller
Chamber of Horrors (1929)
One Family (1930) - The Mother
Hobson's Choice (1931) - Alice Hobson
In a Monastery Garden (1932) - Roma Romano
The Wandering Jew (1933/I) - Gianella
It's a King (1933) - Princess Yasma
Menace (1934/II) - Lady Conway
The Lash (1934) - Dora Bush
The King of Paris (1934) - Lea Rossignol
Jud Süß (1934) - Magdalen Sibylle
Turn of the Tide (1935) - Amy Lunn
The Lamp Still Burns (1943) - Sister Catley
Strawberry Roan (1944) - Gladys Moon
Great Day (1945) - Miss Allen
The Rake's Progress (1945) - Alice
 They Knew Mr. Knight (1946) - Carrie Porritt
Night Boat to Dublin (1946) - Sidney Vane
A Matter of Life and Death (1946) - Chief Recorder
Corridor of Mirrors (1948) - Caroline Hart
The Temptress (1949) - Lady Clifford
Life in Her Hands (1951) - Sister Tutor
The Scarlet Pimpernel - Duchess of Northumberland in the episode The Imaginary Invalid (1956)

References

External links

English film actresses
People from Rickmansworth
1908 births
1998 deaths
20th-century English actresses
Actresses from Hertfordshire